5 loddrett (5 Down) is a Norwegian comedy film from 1959. It was directed by Nils Reinhardt Christensen, who also wrote the script based on a concept by Lillebil Kjellén. The film was shot at the studio in Jar.

Plot
Knut Jespersen (played by Henki Kolstad) is the manager of a record company. He wants to be a man about town, and one night he meets the seductive nightclub singer Anita Daae (Ingerid Vardund). His wife Randi (Nanna Stenersen) seeks advice from the architect Hans Falkenberg (Knut M. Hansson), and to win her man back she decides to change.

Cast

 Henki Kolstad as Knut Jespersen, the manager of a record company
 Nanna Stenersen as Randi Jespersen, Knut's wife
 Ingerid Vardund as the nightclub singer Anita Daae
 Carsten Winger as Åge Møller, a store manager for A/S Grammofon
 Tore Foss as Colonel Falkenberg
 Knut M. Hansson as the architect Hans Falkenberg
 Joachim Holst-Jensen as Backer, the CEO for A/S Grammofon
 Jon Heggedal as Odd Jespersen, Knut and Randi's son
 Trulte Heide Steen as Mette Jespersen, Knut and Randi's elder daughter
 Elisabeth Hald as Tullemor Jespersen, Knut and Randi's younger daughter
 Ingrid Øvre Wiik as Miss Lyng, a cashier
 Øivind Bergh as a conductor
 Odd Borg as Åkerbø, a singer
 Sverre Wilberg as a butler
 Frithjof Fearnley as Pidden
 Per Skift as Jens
 Ulf Wengård as a rock singer
 Egil Åsman as a rock singer
 Egil Lorck as the angry customer
 Kari Simonsen as a young singer in the studio for an audition
 Helge Reiss as a salesman
 Liv Uchermann Selmer as a maid
 Ingeborg Cook as the ambitious mother

Production
In the scene where Anita Daae meets Knut Jespersen for the first time, Ingerid Vardund wore a costume made by the Norwegian fashion designer William Duborgh Jensen. Sverre Wilberg made his film screen debut in this film. The roles of the two oldest children in the Jespersen family were played by Trulte Heide Steen and Jon Heggedal, who were both theater school students when the film was shot.

Reception
After the premiere of the film at the Saga Cinema, it received four out of six stars from one reviewer. In his assessment, the reviewer found the topic (the wife over the sink and taking care of the children) a bit off-putting, stating "This is probably a problem that will disappear with the next generation, when our government's welfare policy has completely driven all married women into working life." When the film was broadcast on NRK television in 1974, parallels were drawn to the film Støv på hjernen, which was also from 1959.

References

External links
 
 5 loddrett at the National Library of Norway

1959 comedy films
Norwegian comedy films
1950s Norwegian-language films
Norwegian black-and-white films
Films directed by Nils Reinhardt Christensen